Eggerthia catenaformis is an anaerobic, Gram-positive, non-spore-forming rod-shaped bacterium. It is an uncommon cause of infection in humans and is known to be associated with dental abscess.

References

External links 
Type strain of Eggerthia catenaformis at BacDive -  the Bacterial Diversity Metadatabase	

Erysipelotrichia
Bacteria described in 1935